Enyaliopsis is the largest genus in the subfamily Hetrodinae and typical of the tribe Enyaliopsini (family Tettigoniidae: the bush-crickets or katydids). It is made up of 24 species found from east-central to southern Africa.

Enyaliopsis binduranus Peringuey, 1916
Enyaliopsis bloyeti (Lucas, 1885)
Enyaliopsis carolinus Sjostedt, 1913
Enyaliopsis durandi (Lucas, 1884)
Enyaliopsis ephippiatus (Gerst., 1869)
Enyaliopsis guilelmi Sjostedt, 1926
Enyaliopsis ilala Glenn, 1991
Enyaliopsis inflatus Weidner, 1941
Enyaliopsis jennae Glenn, 1991
Enyaliopsis maculipes Sjostedt, 1926
Enyaliopsis matabelensis Sjostedt, 1913
Enyaliopsis monsteri Glenn, 1991
Enyaliopsis mulanje Glenn, 1991
Enyaliopsis nyala Glenn, 1991
Enyaliopsis nyasa Glenn, 1991
Enyaliopsis nyika Glenn, 1991
Enyaliopsis obuncus (I. Bolivar, 1881)
Enyaliopsis parduspes Glenn, 1991
Enyaliopsis patruelis Peringuey, 1916
Enyaliopsis petersii (Shaum, 1853)
Enyaliopsis robustus Weidner, 1955
Enyaliopsis selindae Glenn, 1991
Enyaliopsis transvaalensis Peringuey, 1916
Enyaliopsis viphya Glenn, 1991

References

Tettigoniidae genera
Orthoptera of Africa